Asgar Abdullayev may refer to:
 Asgar Abdullayev (footballer)
 Asgar Abdullayev (scientist)